Two popular American sports were invented in New England. Basketball was invented by James Naismith, a Canadian, in Springfield, Massachusetts, in 1891. Volleyball was invented by William G. Morgan in Holyoke, Massachusetts, in 1895. Also, the first organized ice hockey game in the United States is widely believed to have been played in Concord, New Hampshire in 1883.

The region is famous for its passion for baseball and the Boston Red Sox, as well as for the intense rivalry between the Red Sox and the New York Yankees.

On November 1, 1924, the Boston Bruins of the National Hockey League became the first NHL franchise to be based in the United States, and the second-oldest surviving major professional sports team in Boston, after the Red Sox. The Bruins' historic rivalry with the Montreal Canadiens for ice hockey fans in the Boston area has, at times, reached the level of intensity of the Yankees – Red Sox rivalry in professional baseball in the region.

The New England Patriots football team is based in Foxborough, Massachusetts, halfway between Boston and Providence. In 1999, the Patriots flirted with the idea of moving to Hartford, in what three National Football League (NFL) franchise owners called "the greatest financial deal any NFL owner has ever received". The deal, however, fell through, and the team remained in Foxborough.

Both the oldest Major League Baseball (MLB) professional baseball park still in use, Fenway Park, dating from April 1912, as well as the oldest indoor ice hockey rink still in use worldwide, Matthews Arena, which first opened in 1910 and currently stands on the property of Northeastern University for their collegiate ice hockey teams, are within the Boston city limits.

Famous sportsmen playing for New England teams
Boston Red Sox: Bobby Doerr, Joe Cronin, Johnny Pesky, Carl Yastrzemski, Ted Williams, Jim Rice, Wade Boggs, Carlton Fisk, David Ortiz, Pedro Martinez, Roger Clemens, Jason Varitek, Tim Wakefield, Jimmie Foxx, Lefty Grove, Harry Hooper, Cy Young, Dwight Evans, Rico Petrocelli
Boston Bruins: Eddie Shore, Lionel Hitchman, Bobby Orr, Aubrey "Dit" Clapper, Phil Esposito, Cam Neely, Johnny Bucyk, Milt Schmidt, Rick Middleton, Terry O'Reilly, Ray Bourque, Patrice Bergeron, Wayne Cashman, David Krejci, Bill Cowley, Zdeno Chara, Tiny Thompson, Frank Brimsek, Eddie Johnston, Gerry Cheevers
Boston Celtics: Robert Parish, Dennis Johnson, Bill Russell, Jo Jo White, Bob Cousy, Tom Heinsohn, Satch Sanders, John Havlicek, Dave Cowens, Jim Loscutoff, Don Nelson, Bill Sharman, Ed Macauley, Frank Ramsey, Sam Jones, K.C. Jones, Cedric Maxwell, Kevin McHale, Larry Bird, Paul Pierce
New England Patriots: Gino Cappelletti, Mike Haynes, Steve Nelson, John Hannah, Bruce Armstrong, Jim Lee Hunt, Bob Dee, Tom Brady,  Rob Gronkowski, Nick Buoniconti, Steve Grogan, Andre Tippett, Stanley Morgan, Ben Coates, Jim Nance, Sam Cunningham, Drew Bledsoe, Jon Morris, Troy Brown, Tedy Bruschi, Ty Law, Willie McGinest, Houston Antwine, Kevin Faulk, Raymond Clayborn, Matt Light, Rodney Harrison
Boston Braves: Hugh Duffy, Hank Gowdy, Rabbit Maranville, Tommy McCarthy, Johnny Sain, Kid Nichols, Warren Spahn, Al Spalding, Charles Radbourn 
Hartford Whalers: Rick Ley, Gordie Howe, John McKenzie, Ron Francis, Kevin Dineen, Mike Rogers, Tom Webster, Pat Verbeek

List of professional and semi-professional sports teams in New England

Baseball
Major League Baseball
Boston Red Sox (Boston, Massachusetts)
International League (AAA)
Worcester Red Sox (Worcester, Massachusetts)
Eastern League (AA)
Hartford Yard Goats (Hartford, Connecticut)
New Hampshire Fisher Cats (Manchester, New Hampshire)
Portland Sea Dogs (Portland, Maine)
New York–Penn League (A)
Connecticut Tigers (Norwich, Connecticut)
Lowell Spinners (Lowell, Massachusetts)
Vermont Lake Monsters (Burlington, Vermont)
Atlantic League (Independent)
New Britain Bees (New Britain, Connecticut)
Futures Collegiate Baseball League (Independent)

Football
National Football League
New England Patriots (Foxborough, Massachusetts)
Indoor Football League
Massachusetts Pirates (Worcester, Massachusetts)
New England Football League - Colonial Conference (AAA)
Boston Bandits (Boston, Massachusetts)
Connecticut Panthers (Meriden, Connecticut)
Granite State Destroyers (Raymond, New Hampshire)
Mass State Wolverines (South Hadley, Massachusetts)
Middleboro Cobras (Middleboro, Massachusetts)
New Hampshire Charge (Manchester, New Hampshire)
North Shore Generals (Lynn, Massachusetts)
Rhode Island Wardogs (North Smithfield, Rhode Island)
Southern Maine Raging Bulls (Portland, Maine)

Basketball
National Basketball Association
Boston Celtics (Boston, Massachusetts)
Women's National Basketball Association
Connecticut Sun (Uncasville, Connecticut)
NBA G League
Maine Celtics (Portland, Maine)

Ice hockey
National Hockey League (NHL)
Boston Bruins (Boston, Massachusetts)
American Hockey League (AHL)
Bridgeport Sound Tigers (Bridgeport, Connecticut)
Hartford Wolf Pack (Hartford, Connecticut)
Providence Bruins (Providence, Rhode Island)
Springfield Thunderbirds (Springfield, Massachusetts)
ECHL
Maine Mariners (Portland, Maine)
Worcester Railers (Worcester, Massachusetts)
Premier Hockey Federation (PHF)
Boston Pride (Boston, Massachusetts)
Connecticut Whale (Danbury, Connecticut)

Soccer
Major League Soccer
New England Revolution (Foxborough, Massachusetts)
USL Championship
Hartford Athletic (Hartford, Connecticut)
USL League One
New England Revolution II (Foxborough, Massachusetts)
USL League Two
AC Connecticut (Danbury, Connecticut)
Black Rock FC (Lakeville, Massachusetts)
Boston Bolts (Waban, Massachusetts)
GPS Portland Phoenix (Portland, Maine)
Seacoast United Phantoms (Amesbury, Massachusetts)
Western Mass Pioneers (Ludlow, Massachusetts)
Boston City FC (Revere, Massachusetts)
National Premier Soccer League
Greater Lowell Rough Diamonds (Tyngsborough, Massachusetts)
Hartford City FC (Hartford, Connecticut)
Rhode Island Reds FC (Providence, Rhode Island)

Lacrosse
National Lacrosse League (NLL)
New England Black Wolves (Uncasville, Connecticut) (2015-2021)
Premier Lacrosse League (PLL)
Cannons Lacrosse Club (Boston, Massachusetts)

Motorsports facilities in New England
NASCAR
New Hampshire Motor Speedway (Loudon, New Hampshire)
NHRA
New England Dragway (Epping, New Hampshire)
SCCA
Lime Rock Park (Lime Rock, Connecticut)

Gaelic football
Boston GAA

Rugby union
Major League Rugby
New England Free Jacks (Weymouth, Massachusetts)
USA Rugby Elite Cup
Boston RFC (Boston, Massachusetts)
New England Rugby Football Union

Rugby league
USA Rugby League
Boston Thirteens (Boston, Massachusetts)
New Haven Warriors (New Haven, Connecticut)
Oneida FC (Boston, Massachusetts)
Rhode Island Rebellion (Providence, Rhode Island)
American National Rugby League
Connecticut Wildcats (Norwalk, Connecticut)

NCAA Division I schools in New England

 Football Bowl Subdivision

Boston College (ACC / Hockey East)
University of Connecticut (American / Hockey East)
University of Massachusetts Amherst (Atlantic 10 / Hockey East / Independents)

 Football Championship Subdivision

Boston University (Patriot League / Hockey East)
Brown University (Ivy League / ECAC Hockey)
Bryant University (Northeast)
Central Connecticut State University (Northeast)
Dartmouth College (Ivy League / ECAC Hockey)
Harvard University (Ivy League / ECAC Hockey)
College of the Holy Cross (Patriot League / Atlantic Hockey)
University of Maine (America East / Hockey East / Colonial)
University of New Hampshire (America East / Hockey East / Colonial)
University of Rhode Island (Atlantic 10  / Colonial)
Sacred Heart University (Northeast / Atlantic Hockey)
Yale University (Ivy League / ECAC Hockey)

 Non-football

Fairfield University (Metro Atlantic)
University of Hartford (America East)
University of Massachusetts Lowell (America East / Hockey East)
Northeastern University (Colonial / Hockey East)
Providence College (Big East / Hockey East)
Quinnipiac University* (Metro Atlantic / ECAC Hockey)
University of Vermont (America East / Hockey East)

Additionally, three colleges compete at the Division I level in ice hockey only: American International and Bentley College compete in the Atlantic Hockey Association, while Merrimack compete in Hockey East and America East in the second half of 2013.

Hartford Whalers
Until April 13, 1997, Hartford also had its own major hockey team, the Hartford Whalers. Originally known as the New England Whalers, they changed their name in 1979 after leaving the WHA for the NHL, hoping to carve a niche market in Hartford.

In 1997, the Whalers left Hartford for Raleigh, North Carolina (amid much controversy), where they became the Hurricanes.

Fan base
In the parts of southwestern Connecticut that are close to New York City, most people are New York Yankees and New York Mets fans, who are often self-identified as suburban New Yorkers. The New York Giants and New York Jets also receive significant support from New England, primarily from the southwestern portions of Connecticut. Additionally, until the team relocated to Washington, D.C. for the start of the 2005 season, the Montreal Expos received some fan support in northern New England. The Quebec Nordiques and Montreal Canadiens were the NHL closest teams in Northern New England.

Since the mid nineteen nineties, the University of Connecticut basketball program (winning four men's and 7 women's national titles since 1995) has drawn a large regional following especially in their home state of Connecticut.

The Boston College Eagles hockey team has also attracted a large following, winning four national championships in 2001, 2008, 2010, and 2012. Their football team also garnered support while current Atlanta Falcons quarterback Matt Ryan played for the Eagles.
The Boston University Terriers hockey team has likewise received large support over the years, winning the national championship in 2009, and has been a staple of Boston collegiate hockey over the past century. The Green Line Rivalry between Boston University and Boston College has been said to be one of the greatest rivalries in all of sports; the two teams compete against each other as well as the hockey teams from fellow Boston universities Harvard University Crimson and Northeastern University Huskies.

New England is home to an NFL Football team, the New England Patriots. The Patriots, based in Foxborough, Massachusetts, are the most popular NFL team in Massachusetts. However, the other 5 states all have fan base with another NFL team, but the Patriots remain supreme overall . The Pittsburgh Steelers have a fanbase in eastern New England (Rhode Island, New Hampshire, Maine), and the New York Giants are dominant in the western states (Connecticut, with a sizable number in Vermont).

New Hampshire Motor Speedway is an oval racetrack which has hosted several NASCAR and American Championship Car Racing races, whereas Lime Rock Park is a traditional road racing venue home of sports car races. Both NASCAR Cup races at New Hampshire Motor Speedway draw over 100,000 fans, thus making NHMS the largest capacity sports venue in New England. New Hampshire also possesses the New England Dragway facility in Epping, New Hampshire as one of the very few remaining dragstrips in the New England region.

See also
New England Auto Racers Hall of Fame
NBC Sports Boston
New England Sports Network
Sports in Connecticut
Sports in Maine
Sports in Massachusetts
Sports in New Hampshire
Sports in Rhode Island
:Sports in Vermont

References

 
New England
+
+
+
+
+
+